So Undercover is a 2013 American crime action comedy film directed by Tom Vaughan and written by Allan Loeb and Steven Pearl. Starring Miley Cyrus, Jeremy Piven, and Mike O'Malley. The film was released direct-to-video in the United States on February 5, 2013. The film has been released in theatres of only 13 countries worldwide. The film was held back without a release date from 2011 until 2013.

Plot

Molly Morris, a private investigator based in Dallas, takes photos of cheating men. FBI Agent Armon Ranford interferes one of her investigations to offer her a job with the FBI. The task is to watch over Alex Patrone, the daughter of a Senator involved in an organized-crime case.

Molly is reluctant at first but ultimately decides to accept Ranford's offer as she needs money to bail her gambling father out of debt. She undergoes a makeover, then goes undercover as sorority sister Brook Stonebridge. Molly meets Sasha Stolezinsky, the head of the sorority, and other members, including Becky, Cotton, Hunter, and Alex, whom she has been hired to protect.

Telling Alex they were at the same summer camp, Molly recites something unique to the camp to gain her trust. As Molly meets the sisters, she quickly picks up on the false façade many of them show to fit in. Her roommate Becky is British, but is working on her southern drawl. At first, Molly thinks that Sasha may be a suspect, as she can find no background on her.

Molly also meets her love interest Nicholas Dexter, another student at the college, making small talk about his vintage motorcycle. Nick and Alex note her finely-honed detective skills when they observe a student getting into a professor's car and she details the signs of their affair.

Snooping around Alex's room when she's out, her roommate Taylor catches Molly. She gets away with it by saying she's borrowing something. As Ranford insists Molly look out for people who are falsely portraying themselves, she begins to suspect Professor Talloway. She then discovers that Alex secretly goes off to his home on a lake.

Envious of the positive attention Molly is receiving from the other sisters, Sasha plants some items that have disappeared from various sisters in Molly's things. Ostracized by the sorority, Molly asks her dad to research her, but he calls to tell her he can't find info on Sasha either. So, she searches Sasha's room and discovers she only changed her identity from Suzy Walters so she could start a new life rather than continue to be an outcast like in high school. 
 
Molly continuously reports back to Ranford, who at one point tells her that Nicholas Dexter, her love interest, is not his real name. She initially believes him, locking Nicholas up and knocking him out one night. Molly follows Alex to Talloway's home, only to discover that he is actually a federal agent. She encounters a masked gunman, from whom she escapes. She realises it's Ranford, who drives off with a kidnapped Alex, and soon finds Talloway injured from a gunshot wound outside his home.

When she returns to the sorority house, she encounters two FBI agents working on the case. They are hesitant to believe her at first, but Morris convinces them to help solve the case with her sorority sisters. They execute the plan, rescue Alex, and corner Ranford, who is arrested. Alex hands over an SD card containing the evidence for her father's case to Molly, who hands it over to the feds.

The FBI is pleased with Molly's work, and she is offered a job with them. She declines and instead wants to continue going to college. Two months pass, Molly is doing surveillance of a guy Cotton is dating for her. Nicholas comes up to her, revealing they are dating and they kiss as the film ends.

Cast
 Miley Cyrus as Molly Morris/Brooke Stonebridge
 Jeremy Piven as Armon Ranford
 Mike O'Malley as Sam Morris
 Lauren McKnight as Alex Patrone
 Josh Bowman as Nicholas Dexter
 Kelly Osbourne as Becky Slotsky
 Eloise Mumford as Sasha Stolezinsky
 Megan Park as Cotton Roberts
 Morgan Calhoun as Hunter Crawford
 Alexis Knapp as Taylor Jaffe
 Autumn Reeser as Bizzy
 Matthew Settle as Professor Talloway
 Brittney Lisette Babin as Summer

Production

Casting
In 2010,  Miley Cyrus was announced as portraying Molly Morris, Mike O'Malley would portray Molly's father, Jeremy Piven would portray Armon, Kelly Osbourne would portray Becky, and Josh Bowman would portray Nicholas; Eloise Mumford, Lauren McKnight, and Matthew Settle, among others were announced to be in the cast.

Filming
Principal photography began on December 13, 2010, in Mobile, Alabama, and at Tulane University. The filming finished in January 2011. On August 15, 2011, new scenes were filmed at University of California in Los Angeles and finished days after. Filming was supposed to be held in Sydney, Australia, but this was cancelled for undisclosed reasons.
This film's poster is a parody of the poster of the successful film Mean Girls.

Release
In March 2011, Exclusive Media Group, the film's studio, announced that the Weinstein Company acquired the U.S. distribution rights for the film, and said, "the film will be released in October 2011 when schools are back in session." In October 2012, the U.K. theatrical trailer was released, which announced a release date of December 7, 2012. Later, distributor Millennium Films announced they had acquired the U.S. distribution rights for the film, and said that the film would have a direct-to-video release in the United States on February 5, 2013. The film has been released in theatres of nine countries worldwide; six European markets and three Asian ones. So Undercover was released in Australia on April 10 as a direct-to-video release as it was in the U.S. The film was set to be released in 2011, but it was released in 2013.

Critical reception
The film has received overwhelmingly negative reviews, with a "Rotten" rating of 6% on Rotten Tomatoes based on 16 reviews.

References

External links
 
 
 

2012 films
2012 action comedy films
American independent films
American action comedy films
Exclusive Media films
Films about the Federal Bureau of Investigation
Films directed by Tom Vaughan (director)
Films shot in New Orleans
Films about fraternities and sororities
Direct-to-video action comedy films
2012 independent films
Films scored by Stephen Trask
Films with screenplays by Allan Loeb
2010s English-language films
2010s American films